The Next Generation Air Transportation System (NextGen) is an ongoing United States Federal Aviation Administration (FAA) project to modernize the National Airspace System (NAS). The FAA began work on NextGen improvements in 2007 and plans to finish the final implementation segment by 2030. The goals of the modernization include using new technologies and procedures to increase the safety, efficiency, capacity, access, flexibility, predictability, and resilience of the NAS while reducing the environmental impact of aviation.

History 
The need for NextGen became apparent during the summer of 2000 when air travel was impeded by severe congestion and costly delays. Two years later, the Commission on the Future of the U.S. Aerospace Industry recommended that a multi-agency task force develop an integrated plan to transform the U.S. air transportation system. In 2003, Congress enacted the Vision 100 – Century of Aviation Reauthorization Act, which established the Joint Planning and Development Office (JPDO) to create a unified vision of what the U.S. air transportation system should deliver for the next generation and beyond, to develop and coordinate long-term research plans, and to sponsor cross-agency mission research.

The result of the JPDO's efforts was the creation of the "Integrated National Plan for the Next Generation Air Transportation System" in 2004, which defined high-level goals, objectives, and requirements to transform the air transportation system. In addition to the Department of Transportation and FAA, the plan involved other government agencies with responsibilities in air transportation services, including the National Aeronautics and Space Administration (NASA), National Weather Service, Department of Defense, and Transportation Security Administration.

The JPDO released the "Concept of Operations for the Next Generation Air Transportation System" to the aviation stakeholder community in 2007. The concept of operations provided the overview of NextGen goals for 2025. Growth of the NextGen concept was an evolutionary, step-by-step process, and the JPDO document continued to be updated through 2011. The same year, the FAA published the first version of its expanded Operational Evolution Partnership, which outlined the agency's path to NextGen through 2025.

The original integrated national plan included airport surface and passenger terminal operations and was known as a "curb-to-curb" solution. The concept of operations was intended to drive cross-agency research to validate the concepts and to eliminate ideas and alternatives that were not operationally feasible or beneficial. The FAA focused on the pieces of the air transportation system for which it was responsible – the "gate-to-gate" components. In 2011, the FAA published the report "NextGen Mid-Term Concept of Operations for the National Airspace System". The FAA concept of operations was consistent with the JPDO's broad set of objectives, including maintaining safety and security, increasing capacity and efficiency, ensuring access to airspace and airports, and mitigating environmental impacts. The report identified several key transformational concepts as necessary to achieve NextGen goals and objectives, such as precision navigation and network-enabled information access, and the FAA has made progress on them.

Changes were underway in 2008 when the FAA started to move key parts of NextGen, such as Automatic Dependent Surveillance–Broadcast (ADS-B), from design to delivery. NextGen progress involved expanded research and development capability, participation by the aviation industry and international partners, and support by the White House and Congress, which are highlighted in this section.

The agency established a research and development facility, known as a testbed, at Embry-Riddle Aeronautical University in Daytona Beach, Florida, in 2008. In 2010, the FAA dedicated another testbed, the NextGen Integration and Evaluation Capability Laboratory at the William J. Hughes Technical Center in Atlantic City, New Jersey, for researchers to simulate and evaluate the effects of NextGen components on the NAS. The lab's capability grew in 2013 with a contract awarded to General Dynamics to provide engineering, software design and development, infrastructure, and administrative support.

In 2008, the FAA signed agreements with Honeywell and ACSS to accelerate testing and installation of NextGen technology to detect and alert pilots of safety hazards on the airport surface. NetJets also agreed to equip part of its fleet to test some programs in various areas of the United States. By 2010, the FAA awarded Computer Support Services Inc. a $280 million contract to perform engineering work for NextGen, the first of six contracts that would be awarded under an umbrella portfolio contract. Boeing, General Dynamics, and ITT Corp. received FAA contracts worth up to $4.4 billion to demonstrate on a large scale how NextGen concepts, procedures, and technologies could be integrated into the current NAS. In 2012, the FAA selected Harris Corp., which then subcontracted Dataprobe, to develop the NAS Voice System and manage a $331 million Data Communications Integrated Services contract.

Commercial airlines also became involved in NextGen. In 2011, the FAA signed an agreement with JetBlue to allow the carrier to fly select flights equipped with ADS-B, opening the airline to improved routing and giving the FAA NextGen data through real-time operational evaluations. United Airlines in 2013 announced plans to become the first carrier to equip a portion of its fleet with avionics necessary for Data Communications (Data Comm) under the FAA NextGen Data Comm avionics equipage program. The program was funded to equip 1,900 aircraft across the industry to ensure enough aircraft would participate in Data Comm.

To develop industry consensus for the FAA's midterm goals, the agency established a new task force through RTCA in 2009. The FAA wanted the task force to examine how industry could contribute to and benefit from NextGen, and the agency unveiled a plan in 2010 on how to implement recommendations.

The NextGen Advisory Committee (NAC), established in 2010 to address the task force recommendation to continue industry collaboration, is a federal advisory group comprising aviation stakeholders formed to advise on policy-level NextGen implementation issues facing the aviation community. The FAA and NAC in 2014 agreed on the NextGen Priorities Joint Implementation Plan to accelerate delivery of four core NextGen initiatives over three years to improve efficiency: optimizing operations at airports with multiple runways, increasing the efficiency of surface operations, updating the navigation system from ground-based to primarily satellite-based, and improving communications between aircraft and the ground through a digital system.

The FAA seeks to ensure international air traffic management interoperability and system harmonization for improved safety and efficiency. In 2010, the FAA and the European Commission agreed to cooperate in 22 areas to help in joint research and development of NextGen and Single European Sky ATM Research (SESAR) projects. By 2012, the FAA and the A6 alliance of European air navigation service providers agreed to work toward an interoperable aviation system, and work together to deploy and implement NextGen and SESAR.

Executive Order 13479, Transformation of the National Air Transportation System, signed in 2008 mandated the Secretary of Transportation to establish a NextGen support staff. The FAA Modernization and Reform Act of 2012 included establishing deadlines for adopting existing NextGen navigation and surveillance technology and mandated development of performance-based navigation procedures at the nation's 35 busiest airports by 2015.

In 2010, the FAA's Aviation Safety organization released a work plan that identified how the safety staff would set NextGen standards and oversee safe implementation of new technologies, processes, and procedures. The FAA also issued a final rule mandating NextGen performance requirements for aircraft surveillance equipment. It required aircraft operating in most controlled U.S. airspace to be equipped for ADS-B Out by January 1, 2020.

Justification
A Department of Transportation 30-year outlook report published in 2016, "Beyond Traffic: Trends and Choices 2045", estimated flight delays and congestion cost the U.S. economy more than $20 billion each year. In addition, the report predicted the total number of people flying on U.S. airlines would increase by 50 percent over the next two decades. For capacity to keep pace with increased demand for services, changes were needed in how services were provided.

Civil air transportation contributes $1.8 trillion to the U.S. economy, supports nearly 11 million jobs, and makes up more than 5 percent of the U.S. gross domestic product. NextGen is delivering benefits to continue to support U.S. aviation. Air traffic controllers have better information to track and separate aircraft safely and efficiently. Pilots have more aeronautical, traffic, and weather information in the cockpit. Airlines fly shorter, more direct routes to get passengers to their destinations faster while burning less fuel and producing fewer emissions.

NextGen helps aircraft operators, passengers, the government, and general public through enhanced safety, greater efficiency, and increased capacity. Monetized benefits comprise internal FAA cost savings, reduced passenger travel time, decreased aircraft operating costs, lower fuel consumption, fewer travel delays, avoided cancellations, additional flights, reduced carbon dioxide emissions, and reduced injuries, fatalities and aircraft losses and damages. NextGen systems can also increase controller and pilot productivity, such as with Data Communications.

NextGen improvements are estimated to save 2.8 billion gallons of fuel through 2030 and reduce carbon emissions by more than 650 million metric tons from 2020 to 2040. Implemented changes have produced an estimated $8.5 billion in benefits from 2010 to 2021.

Implementation 
As the NextGen concept formed, the FAA planned its implementation. The agency worked with industry to identify capabilities taking advantage of existing aircraft equipage. This strategy enabled airspace users to realize early benefits while keeping NextGen on course to achieve the FAA's long-term goal of trajectory-based operations (TBO).

Next, the FAA started replacing its infrastructure. Based on previous lessons learned, the agency determined the best way to upgrade its services was to begin with a new infrastructure that could accommodate  the latest enabling technologies and advanced capabilities rather than adding one-off improvements to an aging infrastructure that couldn't accomplish broader transformation.

The FAA modernization programs for En Route Automation Modernization (ERAM) and Terminal Automation Modernization and Replacement (TAMR) are foundational pieces upon which the FAA could build the NextGen vision. These programs support NextGen objectives with modern software architectures that serve as the platform for new capabilities for air traffic controllers and managers.

The FAA uses a widely accepted model for building large-scale automation systems. Program lifecycles are continuous with a planned schedule of technology refreshes. For example, the FAA finished installing the original hardware for ERAM in 2008, and completed software and program acceptance in 2015. In 2016, the agency updated the technology of all major system components that were becoming obsolete. This approach is common to maintain the latest level of technology.

On top of the foundational systems, the FAA then identified key enabling systems that improve communications, navigation, surveillance, traffic flow automation, information sharing, and weather systems. Integrating these systems is anticipated to transform air traffic management to keep pace with the growing needs of an increasingly diverse mix of air transportation system users without sacrificing safety.

Integration is necessary to achieve TBO, which is a method of strategically planning and managing air traffic from airport to airport for optimal performance by using the aircraft's ability to fly precise paths, metering traffic flow using time instead of distance, and faster information sharing between pilots, flight dispatchers, and controllers and managers.

With TBO, the FAA and operators will have improved knowledge of where and when an aircraft is expected to be throughout its flight. This information will be shared between air and ground automation systems and used to better assess how to balance demand and capacity, and minimize the impact of disruptions due to weather, or system or facility outages. TBO's main benefits are improved flight efficiency, and increased throughput, predictability, and operator flexibility.

NextGen is a complex, large-scale system of systems implemented over decades. Systems are always in various stages of lifecycle management from research to technical refreshes. FAA planning reports are used to map the evolution from the legacy National Airspace System (NAS) to NextGen. To manage NextGen with short-term funding horizons, the FAA rolled out improvements in smaller increments with more program segments to ensure affordability.

The FAA is using knowledge gained since 2011 when it published the NextGen Mid-Term Concept of Operations. Working closely with stakeholders, the FAA invested in research and pre-implementation work to determine the feasibility of advanced concepts and their associated benefits. The aviation community understood that many, but not all, of the concepts would produce positive business cases once research and pre-implementation work was under way, and that some goals would be replaced by other concepts in an evolving aviation environment. The FAA refined the path that the NextGen planners envisioned with a few adjustments, eliminating some concepts that were high cost, high risk, or of low benefit based on research and industry feedback.

Six concepts that posed too high a technical risk, for instance those with no available technical solution, were deferred beyond 2030. Some concepts that required more research to garner evidence of perceived operational benefits also have been deferred for implementation into the later segments of NextGen.

The FAA had scheduled initial implementation of all major planned systems by 2025 but not the full integration necessary to provide the complete set of anticipated NextGen benefits. The FAA has made progress in transforming the NAS and expects to finish all the main NextGen components by 2030. The FAA plans on accruing benefits through enterprise-level advanced applications, more aircraft equipage, and full workforce adoption of TBO.

Elements
NextGen is generally described as a shift from a ground-based system of air traffic control to a satellite-based system of air traffic management. It encompasses many technologies, policies, and procedures, and changes are implemented after thorough safety testing. It is composed of many elements that provide benefits individually and collectively to transform the air transportation system.

Communications 
Controller Pilot Data Link Communications, also known as Data Communications (Data Comm), uses typed digital messages to supplement voice communications between air traffic controllers and pilots. Unlike voice messages, Data Comm messages sent by controllers are delivered only to the intended aircraft, which eliminates the chance of another pilot acting on instructions for another aircraft with a similar call sign. It avoids the chance of misunderstood messages because of busy radio chatter or variations in the way people speak, and it can be a backup if a microphone malfunctions. It also preserves radio bandwidth when voice communication is necessary or preferred.

Using Data Comm, tower air traffic controllers can send pilots of equipped aircraft departure clearance instructions to read, accept, and load into their flight management system with the push of a button. Messages also are sent to flight dispatchers, giving everyone a shared awareness for faster reactions to changing circumstances, such as approaching thunderstorms.

Data Comm saves aircraft time waiting to take off, particularly when routes change, which reduces fuel use and engine exhaust emissions. It lowers the chances of delays or cancellations when weather affects the flight route. Pilots and controllers also can spend more time on other critical tasks, which enhances safety.

The first part of the program for 55 airports, tower service, finished in 2016 more than two years ahead of schedule. It helps equipped aircraft take off sooner through messages quickly exchanged and clearly understood. Based on this success, air carriers requested and the FAA approved in 2017 seven more airports to receive tower services to be completed by 2019. The first of these airports completed was Joint Base Andrews in November 2017. The final airport was Van Nuys, which was completed in August 2018. In 2020, Cincinnati, Jacksonville, and Palm Beach were authorized to become the next three airports approved to operate Data Comm. Cincinnati started operating in 2021, and Jacksonville and Palm Beach began in 2022.

Data Comm is expected to provide more benefits to air carriers and passengers for aircraft flying at cruising altitudes. Various air traffic controller messages will be available, including the ability to reroute multiple aircraft. Initial Data Comm services for high-altitude flight started in November 2019. It is operating at the Indianapolis, Kansas City, Miami, Minneapolis, Oakland, and Washington air route traffic control centers. Initial and full en route services, which bring a wider array of messages than initial, are scheduled to be complete at all centers in 2026.

Voice communication will always be part of air traffic control. In critical situations, they continue to be the primary form of controller-pilot interaction. However, for routine communications between pilots and controllers, Data Comm will increase efficiency and airspace capacity. Data Comm is expected to save operators more than $10 billion over the 30-year life cycle of the program and the FAA about $1 billion in future operating costs.

Navigation 
Performance Based Navigation (PBN) is an instrument flight rules way of moving through airspace that varies depending on equipage, navigational aids, and pilot training. Performance standards for certain airspace are conveyed to pilots through navigation specifications published by the FAA that identify the aircraft avionics and choice of ground- or satellite-based navigation aids that may be used to meet performance requirements.

PBN comprises area navigation (RNAV) and required navigation performance (RNP). With RNAV, equipped aircraft fly any desired path within the coverage of ground- or space-based navigation aids, within the capability of aircraft equipage, or both. RNP is an advanced form of RNAV. Aircraft must be equipped to monitor onboard navigation performance and alert pilots trained to use it if a requirement is unmet during an operation. Aircraft can operate safely near mountainous terrain or in congested airspace by using RNP procedures.

PBN primarily uses satellite-enabled technology and creates precise, repeatable, and predictable 3-D flight paths free from the constraints previously imposed by the physical location of ground-based navigation infrastructure. A new route structure makes straighter paths possible for greater efficiency, and more routes can fit into the same airspace, which increases capacity. From 2009 to 2016, PBN procedures available nearly tripled at airports across the nation. As of November 3, 2022, the FAA has published 9,801 PBN procedures and routes. These consist of RNAV standard instrument departures, T-Routes (1,200 feet above the surface to 18,000 feet of altitude), Q-Routes (18,000–45,000 feet of altitude), RNAV standard terminal arrivals (STAR), RNAV (GPS) approaches, and RNP approaches. Of the airports that publish instrument approach procedures, 96 percent publish PBN approach procedures and 31 percent use only PBN approach procedures.

RNAV STAR procedures can provide a continuous descent approach also known as an optimized profile descent from cruising altitude to save fuel and reduce emissions and noise. The FAA has published RNAV STAR procedures at 128 airports with this capability that enable aircraft to fly closer to the airport at a more fuel-efficient altitude before descending. From the top of the descent to landing, the aircraft has minimal level-off segments, and pilots can avoid using speed brakes and frequently adjusting the thrust lever, which also saves fuel. These procedures can be flown when available and when pilots are able to use them.

Using the Wide Area Augmentation System, instrument-rated pilots now can land at airports where it was previously impossible using just GPS. At an airport where a ground-based Instrument Landing System (ILS) may be out of service, PBN approach procedures serve as a backup. The FAA will seldom, if ever, install a new ILS, opting instead for PBN approach procedures, which save money. The FAA is working to cut costs by reducing the amount of ground-based navigation infrastructure, which will remain as alternative in case of satellite service disruptions. The VOR minimum operational network and NextGen distance measuring equipment are the two sources that provide navigation resiliency.

In response to recommendations from the aviation community through RTCA's NextGen Mid-Term Implementation Task Force, the FAA began integrating PBN procedures to improve air traffic flow for 11 metroplexes, which are metropolitan areas where crowded airspace serve the needs of multiple airports. Through collaboration with the NextGen Advisory Committee, the FAA completed its projects at Atlanta, Charlotte, Cleveland-Detroit, Denver, Houston, Las Vegas, Northern California, North Texas, South Central Florida, Southern California, and Washington, D.C. Additionally, the FAA redesigned airspace incorporating PBN for 29 busy airports not meeting Metroplex program criteria.

PBN procedures also reduced oceanic separation standards laterally and longitudinally from 100 nautical miles to 30 nmi. PBN improved lateral separation standards for approaches at airports with closely spaced parallel runways from 4,300 feet to 3,600 feet in 2013, and an equivalent lateral spacing operations standard enabled through PBN gives extra flexibility at airports for extra departures. A rule change in 2015 allowed pilots to use a PBN approach procedure to take a shorter path to the runway more frequently. Aircraft can safely and efficiently land at certain airports with parallel runways without receiving directions from air traffic controllers monitoring them on radar. The FAA implemented a national standard in 2016 for that capability, which is known as Established on RNP.

The FAA aims for PBN to be used as a basis for daily operations throughout the National Airspace System, employing the appropriate procedure to meet the need. In some cases — as with metroplexes — this will include a highly structured, yet flexible, navigation pattern.

Surveillance 
Automatic Dependent Surveillance–Broadcast (ADS-B) is a technology that brings a major change to flight tracking. Instead of using ground-based radar to receive aircraft position, speed, and direction every five to 12 seconds, aircraft equipped with newer GPS transponders determine this information and automatically send it once per second to air traffic control. ADS-B depends on an accurate satellite signal for position data. It is always broadcasting and requires no operator intervention. For the first time, pilots and air traffic controllers can see the same real-time display of air traffic, which substantially improves situational awareness for improved safety.

The FAA completed installation of new ground radio infrastructure in 2014, and coverage is available in all 50 states, Guam, Puerto Rico, the Gulf of Mexico, and area off both coasts. Integration of ADS-B into en route and terminal automation platforms was completed in 2019. Aircraft flying in most controlled airspace are required to be equipped for ADS-B Out as of January 1, 2020.

The FAA is evaluating space-based ADS-B surveillance services for oceanic airspace as part of a project called Advanced Surveillance Enhanced Procedural Separation. Moving from the current system of ADS-B ground stations to radios hosted on satellites offers the potential for reduced separation standards. Even with the capabilities offered by ADS-B through satellite technology, surveillance radar is still relevant and will be used as a supplement and ultimately as backup to ADS-B in the event of service disruption.

ADS-B Out 
With ADS-B Out, surveillance coverage increases because ground stations can be placed where obstructions or physical limitations don't allow radar. Future intended time and position of aircraft will be more accurate for optimal flight and traffic flow. Airlines that fly routes over the Gulf of Mexico or offshore routes without radar coverage can use ADS-B to follow more-efficient routes and be diverted less often due to weather.

At the nation's busiest airports, ADS-B Out is part of Airport Surface Detection Equipment–Model X at 35 sites and Airport Surface Surveillance Capability, which operates at eight sites with one more location planned. Controllers can track the surface movement of aircraft and airport ground vehicles, which helps reduce the risk of taxiway conflicts and runway incursions.

Another ground-based surveillance system that uses ADS-B is Wide Area Multilateration (WAM), which can be installed in locations where radar is limited or can't be used. It operates at many airports in the Colorado mountains; Juneau, Alaska; Charlotte, N.C.; and Southern California Terminal Radar Approach Control facility. Additional WAM services are planned for the Atlanta and New York metropolitan areas.

Because of the more frequent position update and coverage in areas without radar, ADS-B Out helps in performing life-saving search and rescue missions.

ADS-B In 
Operators who choose to equip their aircraft to receive ADS-B signals for ADS-B In can gain many other benefits and is where industry gains the most value for investing in ADS-B Out.

Traffic Information Services-Broadcast is a free service sending relevant traffic position reports to appropriately equipped aircraft to enhance safety. For general aviation aircraft, ADS-B Traffic Awareness System offers a low-cost alerting capability to prevent aircraft collisions. The more advanced Airborne Collision Avoidance System X will support access to closely spaced runways in almost all weather conditions, flight deck interval management (IM), and separation similar to traditional visual operations with fewer nuisance alerts. The FAA expects ACAS X will replace the Traffic Alert and Collision Avoidance System.

Flight Information Services-Broadcast is another free service delivering aeronautical and weather information to pilots to increase safety and efficiency.

In-Trail Procedures (ITP) reduce separation between aircraft during oceanic flights and is allowed for ITP-equipped aircraft in all oceanic airspace managed by Anchorage, New York, and Oakland en route centers. ADS-B-equipped aircraft with ITP software can fly more often at more fuel-efficient or less-turbulent flight levels. Equipment standards are complete and ready for manufacturers to produce the necessary avionics.

The FAA is developing IM applications that use ADS-B In to sequence and space aircraft pairs. IM's precise spacing enables more-efficient flight paths in congested airspace and maximizes airspace and airport use. Enhanced air traffic control capabilities for closely spaced parallel runway approach operations may also be assisted by ADS-B In that is integrated with the terminal automation system.

The first ground-based phase began operating at the Albuquerque Air Route Traffic Control Center in 2014. In 2017, the FAA supported a NASA evaluation of prototype avionics and procedures. The FAA sponsored a demonstration of IM operations using prototype avionics on closely spaced parallel runways at San Francisco International Airport in 2019. These flight demonstrations showed precise spacing is possible in real-world environments.

The FAA worked with American Airlines and ACSS to install ADS-B In avionics that enable IM on the airline's fleet of Airbus A321 aircraft. The avionics enabled initial IM operations in Albuquerque en route airspace starting in 2022. Operations will be used to gather benefits data to share with the aviation community to motivate other air carriers to equip for ADS-B In. The FAA plans to deploy IM operations across the U.S. National Airspace System after 2025.

Another application is Cockpit Display of Traffic Information Assisted Visual Separation (CAVS), which is used by air carriers to enhance traffic situational awareness. It allows a flight crew to continue a visual landing procedure using the electronic display to maintain separation if the pilot loses sight of traffic because of reduced visibility, which reduces time and distance flown. Standards are complete and ready for manufacturers to produce the necessary avionics. As with IM, CAVS was installed on the American Airlines fleet of Airbus A321 aircraft, and the airline plans on sharing its data with the aviation community. The airline started operating CAVS in May 2021.

Although it can be used without it, a NASA-developed application called Traffic Aware Strategic Aircrew Requests (TASAR) could benefit from aircraft equipped with ADS-B In. TASAR suggests a new route or altitude change to save time or fuel, and ADS-B In can assist by enabling the software to determine what requests will likely be approved by air traffic control due to nearby traffic. A NASA study of Alaska Airlines flights projected that the airline would save more than 1 million gallons of fuel, more than 110,000 minutes of flight time, and $5.2 million annually.

Automation

Air Traffic Control Computer Stations 
En route automation drives display screens used by air traffic controllers to safely manage and separate aircraft at cruising altitudes. Terminal automation is for controllers to manage air traffic immediately around major airports. It is used for separating and sequencing of aircraft, conflict and terrain avoidance alerts, weather advisories, and radar vectoring for departing and arriving traffic.

The FAA's En Route Automation Modernization (ERAM) platform replaced the legacy Host system for en route air traffic control in 2015. A sustainment and enhancement program is in progress and scheduled to be completed in 2026. En route controllers can now track as many as 1,900 aircraft at a time, up from the previous 1,100 limit. Coverage extends beyond facility boundaries, enabling controllers to handle traffic more efficiently. This coverage is possible because ERAM can process data from 64 radars versus 24.

For pilots, ERAM increases flexible routing around congestion, weather, and other restrictions. Real-time air traffic management and information sharing on flight restrictions improves airlines' ability to plan flights with minimal changes. Reduced vectoring and increased radar coverage leads to smoother, faster, and more cost-efficient flights.

Trajectory modeling is more accurate, allowing maximum airspace use, better conflict detection, and improved decision-making. Two functionally identical channels with dual redundancy eliminate a single point of failure. ERAM also provides a user-friendly interface with customizable displays. It revolutionizes controller training with a realistic, high-fidelity system that challenges developmental practices with complex approaches, maneuvers, and simulated pilot scenarios that were unavailable with Host.

The Terminal Automation Modernization and Replacement program's Standard Terminal Automation Replacement System (STARS) replaced the legacy system. Installation was completed in 2021, and it is operating at more than 200 FAA and Department of Defense (DoD) terminal radar approach control facilities, and more than 600 FAA and DoD air traffic control tower facilities. STARS maintains safety while increasing cost-effectiveness at terminal facilities across the National Airspace System. It provides advanced features and functionalities for controllers, such as a state-of-the-art flat-panel LED display and the ability to save controller workstation preferences. It is also is easier for technicians to maintain.

Although ERAM and STARS are not NextGen programs themselves, they lay the foundation to enable critical NextGen capabilities in terminal and en route airspace.

Traffic Flow Decision Support Systems 
These FAA Decision Support Systems (DSS) are used by air traffic controllers to optimize traffic flow across the National Airspace System (NAS) and are central to the FAA's goal of trajectory-based operations:

 Traffic Flow Management System (TFMS)
 Time Based Flow Management (TBFM)
 Terminal Flight Data Manager (TFDM)
TFMS is the primary automation system used by the Air Traffic Control System Command Center and nationwide traffic management units to regulate air traffic flow, manage throughput, and plan for future air traffic demand. TFMS's 31 tools exchange information and support other DSS through System Wide Information Management (SWIM). The FAA deployed a TFMS software refresh to 82 sites in 2016 and completed a hardware refresh at those sites in 2018. The FAA continues to develop future concepts for TFMS modeling and predicting capabilities. Flow Management and Data Services (FMDS) is the planned replacement for TFMS, with initial operation set for 2029. FMDS is expected to improve data integration, increase data sharing, and manage the larger volume of continually produced NAS data.

TBFM allows traffic management units to schedule and optimize the arrival load for major airports. It is operational at 20 en route centers, 28 TRACONs, and 54 airport towers. Its tools, such as extended metering and integrated departure arrival capability, help controllers sequence traffic with time instead of distance. Performance Based Navigation route and procedure data help improve predicted arrival times. The integrated departure arrival capability tool deployed to the sixth and final site in June 2022.

One future TBFM tool will lengthen its metering capability into terminal airspace with the terminal sequencing and spacing tool developed by NASA and delivered to the FAA in 2014. A new capability in development is machine learning trajectory prediction used to project aircraft location by using aircraft performance models. Through 2027, TBFM will be upgraded to meet security requirements.

In 2016, the FAA awarded Lockheed Martin a $344 million contract to develop and deploy TFDM, which is a new system for surface management. It delivers decision support capabilities on the airport ground by integrating flight, surface surveillance, and traffic management information using SWIM. TFDM tools consist of electronic flight progress strips, departure queue management, surface management, and surface situational awareness. Implementation of electronic flight data and the integration of TBFM and TFMS through SWIM will enable TFDM to consolidate some previously independent systems.

The FAA started early implementation of the Surface Visualization Tool in 2014 and electronic flight strips in 2015. The FAA and NASA in 2021 finished research and testing on a surface scheduling capability that calculates gate pushbacks at busy hub airports so that each airplane can roll directly to the runway and take off. TFDM will be deployed in two configurations. Configuration A has full functionality, and Charlotte is scheduled to start operating in March 2024, the first of 27 large, high-density airports. Configuration B has improved electronic flight data and electronic flight strips. Cleveland began operating with these capabilities in October 2022. Another 21 sites are scheduled to receive this configuration. Deployment at all locations is planned for completion in 2029.

Advanced Technologies and Oceanic Procedures 
Advanced Technologies and Oceanic Procedures (ATOP) replaced existing oceanic air traffic control systems and procedures. ATOP fully integrates flight and radar data processing, detects conflicts between aircraft, provides satellite data link communications and surveillance, eliminates paper flight strips, and automates manual processes.

ATOP fully modernizes oceanic air traffic control automation and allows flight operators to take further advantage of investments in cockpit digital communications. The FAA reduces intensive manual processes that limit controllers' ability to safely handle airline requests for more efficient tracks or altitudes over long oceanic routes. The FAA can meet international commitments of reducing aircraft separation standards, which increase flight capacity and efficiency.

ATOP is used at all three oceanic en route traffic control centers, which are in Anchorage, New York, and Oakland. After the first technology refresh in 2009, ATOP's second refresh was completed at these centers in 2020, which is intended to support the system through 2028. An enhancement program started in 2018 comprises five large-scale capabilities. Deployment began in 2021 and will continue to 2024 in four annual software releases.

Information Management

System Wide Information Management 
The FAA traditionally shared information using a variety of technologies, including radio, telephone, Internet, and dedicated connections. However, the agency leveraged new information management technologies to improve information delivery and content. In 2007, the FAA established the SWIM program to implement a set of information technology principles in the National Airspace System (NAS) and provide users with relevant and commonly understandable information. SWIM facilitates NextGen's data-sharing requirements, serving as the digital data-sharing backbone. This platform offers a single point of access for more than 100 products, categorized into aeronautical, flight and traffic flow, and weather data. Producers can publish data once, and approved consumers can access needed information through a single connection, an improvement over the legacy way of connecting two systems with fixed network connections and custom point-to-point application-level data interfaces. The new format supports collaboration within domestic and international aviation communities.

In 2015, the SWIM program completed its first segment, which established a common infrastructure and connection points at all en route traffic control centers. The program's second segment beginning in 2016 established a service-oriented architecture — composed of producers, consumers, and a registry — and connected National Airspace System (NAS) programs, such as the Traffic Flow Management System, to provide large data sources for consumers. Several enhancements are being deployed, including improved security, and SWIM continues to add NAS air traffic management content providers and consumers.

As of 2022, 15 FAA programs and several external organizations, including airlines, provide data for 80 services sent via the SWIM network. More than 800 consumers are registered to access the information, and of those, about 400 are regular users. A cloud distribution system established in 2019 is expected to help further increase the number of users. The revised setup of SWIM reduces costs, can increase operational efficiency, and opens the possibility of creating new services for the aviation community. Data sharing among pilots, flight operations personnel, controllers, and air traffic managers will be essential to achieving a NextGen objective of trajectory-based operations.

Airlines and airports report using FAA data to improve operations. The most extensive use of SWIM data was supporting improved awareness of operating conditions and flight status, especially on the airport surface and in situations when aircraft transition from the control of one air traffic control center to another. The most dynamic use of real-time surveillance data outside the FAA may be providing flight-tracking services to the flying public and aviation businesses. Through web browsers and mobile apps, service subscribers can access current information about flight and airport status and delays.

Aeronautical Mobile Airport Communication System  
Transmission of information necessary to conduct efficient airport surface operations in the years ahead will be possible with the Aeronautical Mobile Airport Communication System (AeroMACS). The system uses wireless broadband technology that supports the increasing need for data communications and information sharing on the airport surface for fixed and mobile applications now and into the future.

Besides improved capacity, aging airport communications infrastructure requires more extensive and expensive monitoring, maintenance, repair, or replacement. Airport construction and unexpected equipment outages also require temporary communications alternatives, and AeroMACS also could serve as a backup. The system was implemented in 2017 under the FAA Airport Surface Surveillance Capability program. As of December 2020, more than 50 airports in nearly 15 countries are using AeroMACS.

Weather 
The FAA's NextGen Weather program provides aviation weather products that support air traffic management during weather events, helping to improve aviation safety and minimize passenger delays. The largest cause of National Airspace System (NAS) air traffic delays is weather, which was responsible for 69 percent of system-impacting delays of more than 15 minutes from 2008 to 2013. With more accurate and timely weather predictions, airports and airlines could prevent as many as two-thirds of weather-related delays and cancellations.

Aviation weather is composed of information observation, processing, and dissemination. NextGen weather systems consist of the NextGen Weather Processor (NWP) to generate advanced aviation-specific weather products and Common Support Services– Weather (CSS-Wx) for dissemination of these products, both scheduled to start operating in the NAS in 2024.

The NWP program establishes a common weather processing platform to replace the legacy FAA weather processor systems and offer new capabilities. The fully automated NWP will identify safety hazards around airports and in cruising altitude airspace. It will support strategic traffic flow management, including the translated weather information needed to predict route blockage and airspace capacity constraints up to eight hours in advance. NWP will use advanced algorithms to create current and predicted aviation-specific weather information with data from the FAA and National Oceanic and Atmospheric Administration (NOAA) radar and sensors, and NOAA forecast models. Part of the NWP, the Aviation Weather Display consolidates the current Weather and Radar Processor, Integrated Terminal Weather System, and the Corridor Integrated Weather System displays. The Aviation Weather Display will provide consistent weather information at a glance for en route and terminal controllers, and includes NWP and NOAA weather products.

CSS-Wx will be the single producer of weather data, products, and imagery within the NAS, using standards-based weather dissemination via System Wide Information Management. It will consolidate and enable the decommissioning of legacy weather dissemination systems. It also offers NWP and NOAA weather products, and other weather sources for integration into air traffic decision support systems, improving the quality of traffic management decisions and enhancing controller productivity during severe weather. CSS-Wx information consumers will include air traffic controllers and managers, commercial and general aviation operators, and the flying public.

The FAA's Weather Technology in the Cockpit team of researchers are experts on the pitfalls of how weather is displayed in general aviation cockpits. Their main research goal is to encourage improvements in how meteorological information is shown in the cockpit so pilots can consistently and accurately interpret that information, understand its limitations and use it effectively to avoid bad weather.

Multiple Runway Operations and Separation Management 
Efficiency of multiple runway operations (MRO), particularly those that are closely spaced, has been limited by safety risks, including collisions and wake turbulence with nearby aircraft. MRO advancements improve access to closely spaced parallel runways to enable more departure and arrival operations during instrument meteorological conditions, which increase efficiency and capacity while reducing flight delays. MRO enables the use of simultaneous approaches in low-visibility conditions, decreases separation for approaches to runways with stricter spacing requirements, and reduces the effects of wake turbulence that leads to increased separation.

Revised wake separation standards, known as wake recategorization or wake recat, were reduced at 14 terminal radar approach control facilities and 28 airports across the United States. At Indianapolis, airlines save more than $2 million per year in operational costs with wake recat. At Philadelphia, airlines save about $800,000 per year.

Phase 1 of wake recat replaced a weight-based standard with new size categories more optimally based on aircraft wake turbulence characteristics. Phase 1.5 refined Phase 1 with further reductions to separation. Phase II defined pair-wise wake turbulence separation standards among 123 aircraft types that make up 99 percent of global operations at 32 U.S. airports. Air traffic control operations then can implement custom wake turbulence categories that are optimized to maximize the benefit for an airport fleet.

Phases 1 and 1.5 were implemented at 31 airports. Consolidated wake turbulence (CWT) aimed to use the best set of separation standards derived from these phases. The FAA finished converting legacy standards from the two phases into CWT standards at 19 terminal radar approach control (TRACON) facilities in 2022.

The FAA continues to evaluate procedures at airports with closely spaced runways. After determining that lateral runway separation can be reduced safely, the FAA revised the separation standard from 4,300 feet to 3,600 feet for independent arrivals in August 2013. For independent runways, aircraft can approach without having to maintain a staggered diagonal separation required by dependent operations. Further revisions to closely spaced parallel operations were included in the November 2015 update to FAA Order 7110.65, Air Traffic Control.

The new procedures reduce lateral separation requirements to as close as 3,900 feet for triple independent approaches, and 3,000 feet for offset dual independent approaches without requiring high-update-rate radar or Automatic Dependent Surveillance–Broadcast. For dual dependent approaches, the runway spacing requirement remains 2,500 feet, but the diagonal spacing is reduced from 1.5 nautical mile (nm) to 1 nm.

FAA Order 7110.308C identifies specific airports — Boston, Cleveland, Memphis, Newark, Philadelphia, Seattle, San Francisco, and St. Louis — with runways spaced less than 2,500 feet apart that can reduce staggered spacing between aircraft on parallel approaches from 1.5 nm to 1 nm.

Dual independent parallel operations started operating in Atlanta in 2014. Dependent parallel operations at 1.0 nm for runways less than 2,500 feet to 3,600 feet apart began operations at Dallas-Love Field,  Memphis, Minneapolis-St. Paul, New York-JFK, Portland, Raleigh-Durham, and Seattle in 2016, and in San Francisco in 2017. Triple independent parallel operations started in Atlanta and Washington-Dulles in 2017. Dual independent parallel operations with offset started operating in Detroit in 2015 and at Chicago-O'Hare in 2016. Dependent parallel operations for runways more than 3,600 feet apart started operating at Cincinnati/Northern Kentucky, Louisville, Memphis, and Phoenix in 2017. No further changes are planned.

The Converging Runway Display Aid is an automation tool used by air traffic controllers to manage the sequence of arrival flows on converging or intersecting runways. It is operational at Boston, Chicago O'Hare, Denver, Las Vegas, Memphis, Minneapolis-St. Paul, Newark, Phoenix, and Philadelphia, and enhances an airport's effective throughput under certain conditions.

A separation efficiency tool called Automated Terminal Proximity Alert was first implemented at Minneapolis-St. Paul in May 2011 and now is deployed at 14 TRACON facilities across the country. It better informs air traffic controllers of gaps so they can tell pilots to adjust their speed or direct them on a shorter path to the runway. During its first year of use, the number of go-arounds declined by 23 percent for flights headed to Minneapolis-St. Paul. Excess flight time due to a go-around decreased by 19 percent.

Improved Approaches and Low-Visibility Operations 
The FAA supports several optional capabilities for operators who need to access an airport when the cloud ceiling is less than 200 feet above the runway or visibility is less than a half mile. They help to achieve NextGen goals of safely increasing access, efficiency, and throughput at many airports when low visibility is the limiting factor.

Expanded Low Visibility Operations is a low-cost infrastructure program to reduce minimum ceilings and runway visual range through a combination of ground equipment and navigation procedures. Most ELVO improvements result from FAA Order 8400.13.

Head-up displays (HUD) were approved to use on a precision approach to lower minimum decision heights to land. Use of a qualified HUD when flying to a suitable Instrument Landing System facility will reduce the required runway visual range visibility for approach.

After a reduction of minimum visual runway range requirements, an FAA assessment showed airport access during low-visibility conditions improved in two ways: almost 6 percent fewer periods of time with no access and 17 percent more flights could land.

The FAA allows the use of an enhanced flight vision system (EFVS) instead of natural vision to conduct an instrument landing procedure in low-visibility conditions. EFVS uses sensor technologies to provide a clear, real-time virtual image to the pilot of the view outside the aircraft, regardless of the cloud cover and visibility conditions. Pilots can identify required visual references that would be impossible without it. It provides access that otherwise would be denied because of low visibility. A synthetic vision guidance system combines flight guidance display technology with high-precision position assurance monitors to provide a continuous and correct depiction of the external scene and runway. It can assist a pilot's transition to natural vision references.

Another NextGen project is the Ground Based Augmentation System Landing System (GBAS). It uses GPS to support all precision-approach categories. Newark and Houston operate non-federal GBAS systems approved for operations to as low as 200 feet above the runway.

Initial tailored arrivals are available for certain aircraft flying into Los Angeles, Miami, and San Francisco. These arrivals are planned, fixed routes for aircraft approaching these airports from oceanic airspace that are communicated via a data link from the air traffic controller. They limit vectoring and minimize the time the aircraft spends maintaining level flight during descent, which reduces fuel consumption, aircraft exhaust emissions, and time in flight. These differ from Performance Based Navigation's optimized profile descents because they are tailored to the characteristics of a limited number of aircraft types equipped with the Future Air Navigation System.

Airport Mapping 
The FAA Office of Airports Geographic Information System (GIS) program provides data to manage aeronautical information and NextGen implementation. GIS identifies the geographic location and characteristics of natural or constructed features or boundaries on the earth's surface. The airport data is used to develop and implement obstruction analyses, more accurate Notices to Airmen and flight deck airport moving map functionality, and Performance Based Navigation procedures, including Wide Area Augmentation System/Localizer Performance with Vertical Guidance approaches.

Remote Towers 
The FAA is evaluating remote tower technology as a potentially cost-effective alternative to traditional federal contract towers.

Remote tower technology may enable controlled air traffic for small airports without a physical tower or that need to replace an aging tower. Controllers from the remote site may monitor and separate traffic by viewing the scene at the airport equipped with a panoramic color video cameras with pan-tilt-zoom and night vision features  Automated identification and relevant aircraft information may also be displayed on video monitors. The FAA is planning to create a generic test bed at the William J. Hughes Technical Center and Atlantic City International Airport to better understand the full capabilities of a remote tower system.

At Leesburg Executive Airport in Virginia, the FAA authorized air traffic control services to continue using this system as a test site. A second tower is in testing at Northern Colorado Regional Airport near Fort Collins/Loveland.

Energy and Environment 
The FAA's environmental vision is to develop and operate a system that protects the environment while allowing for sustained aviation growth. The FAA Office of Environment and Energy Research and Development is working to reduce air and water pollution, carbon dioxide emissions that may affect climate, and noise that can disturb residents near airports. Airframe and aircraft engine technology, alternative fuels, air traffic management modernization and operational improvements, improved scientific knowledge and integrated modeling, and policies, environmental standards, and market-based measures will contribute toward meeting almost all of these goals. Noise and emissions will be the main environmental problems for National Airspace System capacity and flexibility unless they are effectively managed and mitigated.

An FAA study conducted in 2015 showed that since 1975, the number of people flying in the United States increased from about 200 million to an estimated 800 million, yet the number of people exposed to significant aircraft noise had dropped from about 7 million to nearly 340,000. Even with this decrease, community concern regarding aircraft noise is climbing. The FAA aims to minimize the impact of noise on residential areas without compromising safety. The agency's goal was to reduce the number of people around airports exposed to a day-night average aircraft sound level of 65 decibels to less than 300,000 by 2018. One way the agency planned to achieve that goal was by adopting a new noise standard for certain newly certificated subsonic jet airplanes and subsonic transport category large airplanes.

The FAA's neighborhood environment survey, the largest of its kind, about aircraft noise exposure and its effects on communities around airports was completed in 2016. The results showed that considerably more people are upset by aircraft noise regardless of the level. The FAA will use those results and other research under way to re-evaluate criteria to define significance under the National Environmental Policy Act and federal land use guidelines. In addition, the FAA has researched other impact areas, such as sleep disturbance, cardiovascular health, and children's learning. The FAA also is examining the potential noise effects of new aircraft in the National Airspace System, such as unmanned aircraft systems and civil supersonic aircraft, and spacecraft.

The Continuous Lower Energy, Emissions, and Noise (CLEEN) program is a public-private partnership under NextGen to accelerate development and commercial deployment of more-efficient technologies and sustainable alternative fuels. The first five-year agreement with manufacturers produced jet engine, wing, and aerodynamic technologies; automation and flight management systems; fuels; and materials from 2010 to 2015. One result of this effort is General Electric's Twin Annular Pre-mixing Swirler II Combustor, which reduces nitrogen oxide emissions by more than 60 percent compared to the International Civil Aviation Organization (ICAO) nitrogen oxide standard adopted in 2004. A second five-year agreement started in 2015 aimed to lower cumulative noise levels, reduce fuel consumption, cut nitrogen oxide emissions, and speed commercialization of alternative jet fuels. Both phases are estimated to save the aviation industry 36.4 billion gallons of fuel by 2050, reducing airline costs by $72.8 billion and lowering carbon dioxide emissions by 424 million metric tons.

A third five-year phase of CLEEN started in 2021. The FAA awarded more than $100 million for six companies to help develop technologies that reduce fuel use, emissions, and noise. Goals are to reduce carbon dioxide emissions by improving fuel efficiency by at least 20 percent below the relevant ICAO standard, drop nitrogen oxide emissions by 70 percent relative to the most recent ICAO standard, lower particulate matter emissions below the ICAO standard, and slash noise by 25 dB cumulative relative to the FAA Stage 5 standard.

Since 2009, ATSM International approved five ways of producing sustainable alternative jet fuel that requires no modification to aircraft or engines, and more are being developed, tested, and evaluated. The FAA's efforts helped United Airlines use an alternative jet fuel made from hydroprocessed esters and fatty acids for its daily operations at Los Angeles starting in 2016. The airline in 2021 flew a Boeing 737 Max 8 with one of its engines running on 100 percent alternative aviation fuel. The near-term goal is to produce 3 billion gallons of sustainable alternative aviation fuel by 2030, and the ultimate goal is nearly 35 billion gallons by 2050, enough to meet the entire industry need.

More than 222,000 registered piston engine general aviation aircraft can operate with leaded aviation gasoline, the only remaining transportation fuel in the United States that contains lead. The FAA and Piston Aviation Fuels Initiative have been researching an acceptable unleaded fuel alternative. The FAA approved the first unleaded fuel that can be used for all piston engine aircraft September 1, 2022. The goal is to have only unleaded aviation fuel available by the end of 2030.

The FAA uses the Aviation Environmental Design Tool to assess the environmental impact of federal actions at airports as well as on air traffic, airspace, and aviation procedures. Along with other federal agencies and Transport Canada, the FAA funds the Aviation Sustainability Center, which is contributing to developing international aviation emission and noise standards. In 2016, the United States and 22 countries reached an agreement on a first-ever global aircraft carbon dioxide standard to encourage more fuel-efficient technologies to be integrated into aircraft designs. In 2020, the ICAO council adopted a new environmental measure of non-volatile particulate matter emissions. It replaces the 1970s-era "smoke number" — a figure that describes the visibility of emissions — with a much more accurate measure of emissions particles.

Safety 
The FAA's safety program is guided by its Safety Management System — an agency-wide approach that directs the management of NextGen initiatives. NextGen capabilities' benefits must maintain safe operations in the National Airspace System (NAS), and the FAA has many processes to ensure that flying remains safe.

The interconnected nature of NextGen presents complicated safety challenges that call for an integrated approach to safety risk management. Integrated safety risk management explores safety risk from a NAS enterprise framework to identify potential safety gaps inherent in NextGen capabilities. It identifies safety issues by assessing risk across organizational, system, and program boundaries, and relies on FAA-wide collaboration to capture the most relevant safety information to assist in decision-making.

Aviation watchdogs once measured safety by the number of accidents. Commercial aviation accidents eventually became so rare that the FAA began to measure potential precursors to accidents. Loss of a safe margin of separation between aircraft became the risk measure that the FAA tracked and reported. Proximity is a valid indicator, but is an incomplete picture and provides no insight into accidents' causal factors. System Safety Management is a NextGen portfolio of initiatives to develop and implement policies, processes, and analytical tools that the FAA and industry will use to ensure the safety of the NAS. The goal is to be certain that changes introduced with NextGen capabilities maintain or enhance safety while delivering capacity and efficiency benefits to NAS users.

Improved risk analysis processes and new safety intelligence tools help safety analysts go beyond examining past accident data to detecting risk and implementing mitigation strategies for accident prevention. FAA resources such as the Hazard Identification, Risk Management, and Tracking tool; Aviation Safety Information Analysis and Sharing program; and Airport Surface Anomaly Investigation Capability tool provide the platform for improvements to the safety performance measurement infrastructure. They are part of the System Safety Management Transformation project that will enable safety analyses to determine how NAS-wide operational improvements will affect safety and evaluate potential safety risk mitigations. A few other resources in development are the Integrated Safety Assessment Model, Safety Information Toolkit for Analysis and Reporting, and Wake Vortex Safety System tool.

The Commercial Aviation Safety Team (CAST), composed of air carriers, manufacturers, industry associations regulators, labor unions, and air traffic controllers, helped reduce the fatality risk for commercial aviation in the United States by 83 percent from 1998 to 2007. With the help of these new initiatives, the team's latest goal is to lower the U.S. commercial fatality risk another 50 percent by 2025 from the 2010 rate. The CAST plan comprises 96 enhancements aimed at improving safety across a wide variety of operations.

Stakeholder Collaboration 
NextGen modernization is a team effort that involves the FAA workforce and industry, interagency, and international partnerships. The FAA continues to strengthen relationships with its workforce and labor union partners to ensure that everyone has the skills necessary to run the future National Airspace System (NAS). Training will evolve to make sure that the NAS workforce understands — and takes ownership of — the changing operational concepts and their effects on how services are provided. Recurrent air traffic control training will need to evolve from a focus on automation manipulation to one that ensures all participants in the NAS understand the changing operational concepts and their implications for how services are provided. The process requires the engagement and ownership of the entire aviation workforce, including pilots, controllers, inspectors, regulators, flight safety professionals, engineers, technicians, and program managers. The FAA is focused on ensuring that its labor force will have the leadership, technical, and functional skills to safely and productively transition and manage the needs of the future NAS. This transformation includes leadership development, skills identification and development, and attracting talent.

Through the NextGen Advisory Committee (NAC), the FAA and industry have collaborated to identify and deliver the capabilities that matter most to customers. The FAA formed the NAC in 2010 to work with industry stakeholders, set priorities, and deliver benefits. Led by airline executives and others from the aviation community with an intimate understanding of shared challenges and opportunities, the NAC conducts its business in public so that deliberations and findings are transparent.

In 2014, the NAC developed a joint three-year implementation plan for delivering new capabilities with near-term benefits to airports across the country. The process of developing and monitoring this plan provided all parties with a better understanding about planning decisions and has bolstered trust and cooperation among all parties. This collaborative plan, delivered to Congress in October 2014 and updated annually since then, outlined milestones for delivering benefits in a one- to three-year timeframe. The first high-readiness capabilities were improvements in Data Communications, Performance Based Navigation, improved multiple runway operations, and surface operations. At the end of fiscal year 2017, the FAA had completed 157 commitments in these areas. A fifth focus area, Northeast Corridor, was established in 2017 to improve operations in the busy airspace between Washington, D.C. and Boston. Commitments for all focus areas are found in the 2019-2021 joint implementation plan. From January 2019 through March 2020, the FAA completed 87 out of 88 commitments. Remaining milestone dates have extended beyond 2022 because of program delays related to the pandemic.

Besides the NAC, the Advanced Aviation Advisory Committee, formally established in 2018 as the Drone Advisory Committee, and the Research, Engineering, and Development Advisory Committee also bring federal involvement in airspace modernization. Beyond federal advisory committees, the FAA interacts with trade associations through collaborative workgroups, industry days, and conferences.

The FAA established the Interagency Planning Office (IPO) in May 2014 to coordinate actions across the federal government. The IPO leads interagency and international collaboration to resolve complicated challenges critical to NextGen. Its employees leverage stakeholder expertise to identify, research, coordinate, and prioritize shared actions and to bring together the appropriate resources to advance NextGen. The FAA works with the Department of Transportation, National Aeronautics and Space Administration, Department of Defense, Department of Homeland Security, and Department of Commerce. Aviation cybersecurity, unmanned aircraft systems, and NextGen weather are some of the focus areas.

Engaging with the international aviation community through partnerships and regulatory harmonization is the foundation of the FAA's global leadership initiative. The NextGen International Office, a division within the IPO, focuses on coordinating and sharing information with global partners. Its ultimate goal is to support smooth interoperability and harmonization and to provide a mechanism to make air traffic management systems safer and more efficient for air navigation service providers and airspace users. The FAA has international agreements with the European Union, Japan, and Singapore for joint research and development of future air traffic systems. The NextGen International Office also participates with the U.S. Trade Development Agency and Department of Commerce on their agreements with China, Brazil, and Indonesia.

Accommodating All Operations 
The Vision 100—Century of Aviation Reauthorization Act in 2003 included the idea that all forms of aviation would be adapted into National Airspace System (NAS) modernization. As growth of non-traditional forms of aviation have soared since then, the Federal Aviation Administration (FAA) has moved to accommodate new operators by developing traffic management concepts and evaluating technologies to safely incorporate unmanned aircraft systems, spacecraft, and other emerging aircraft into the NAS without disrupting existing traffic.

Unmanned Aircraft Systems 
An unmanned aerial vehicle, commonly known as a drone, is flown by a pilot on the ground or autonomously. An unmanned aircraft system (UAS) includes the equipment—for example communications links to control the aircraft—necessary to safely and efficiently operate the aircraft. Unmanned aircraft are categorized into five groups by size, and they vary in takeoff weight, operating altitude, and speed. They have a variety of applications, including cargo and passenger transportation.

The FAA develops policies, procedures, and rulemaking with stakeholders to enable safe UAS operation. From the first FAA-issued airworthiness certificate for a civil unmanned aircraft in 2005 to the more recent accomplishment of demonstrating a UAS traffic management system in 2019, the FAA reached different milestones toward integrating UAS into the National Airspace System (NAS) as the industry matured.

In 2013, the agency published the first edition of the Integration of Civil Unmanned Aircraft Systems in the National Airspace System Roadmap and approved UAS operations over people. The same year, the FAA announced the selection of these six public entities to develop UAS research and test sites: University of Alaska, State of Nevada, Griffiss International Airport in New York, North Dakota Department of Commerce, Texas A&M University, and Virginia Tech. Another FAA document to address accommodating the continuous growth in the scope of the NAS is the UAS Traffic Management Concept of Operations, which was first published in 2018 and updated in 2020.   

The Drone Advisory Committee, later renamed the Advanced Aviation Advisory Committee, was established in 2018 to improve the safety and efficiency of integrating advanced aviation technologies into the NAS. It includes a range of aviation community stakeholders who provide independent advice and recommendations to the Department of Transportation and the FAA, and respond to FAA tasks.

Advanced Air Mobility 
Advanced air mobility (AAM) is another non-traditional sector of the aerospace industry gaining momentum. In 2021, investment in AAM set a record at more than $7 billion. In August 2022, the FAA set rules that will govern AAM operations.

AAM is intended to safely and efficiently integrate highly automated new aircraft into the NAS and the aviation ecosystem with or without a pilot aboard while cruising at altitudes between 2,000-5,000 feet mean sea level. These aircraft may fly people and cargo between places with limited or no air transportation service in urban, suburban, and regional areas. The FAA is in charge of certifying new technologies and aircraft being developed by industry along with pilots who fly them. Infrastructure for takeoff and landing, how they will operate in the NAS, and community engagement are other facets of FAA involvement.

Urban air mobility (UAM) is a category of AAM that covers mainly electric vertical takeoff and landing aircraft serving in roles such as air taxis, air ambulances, and delivery vehicles of small goods in and around cities. The battery-powered motors of UAM aircraft can provide these services without the fuel consumption, exhaust emissions, and noise of turbine or piston engines in rotorcraft and fixed-wing aircraft.

The FAA published its first UAM Concept of Operations in 2020 is planning an update in 2023. The agency also completed the initial conceptual systems architecture, technical evaluation plan, and operational variation analysis report in 2022.

Operating Environments 
The UAS and AAM industries want to operate with remote pilots or no pilots through greater degrees of autonomy as the industries mature, and the FAA will evaluate these types of aircraft and related technologies. The FAA plans to enable more complex operations involving drones and AAM aircraft.

The integration of UAS into the NAS is evolving to where the pilot no longer must keep the aircraft within sight, which opens up the potential for remotely piloted operations. The FAA is evaluating operations beyond visual line of sight for various drones heavier than 55 pounds flying above 400 feet. Live-flight demonstrations will help to inform stakeholders on needs for communication, navigation, and surveillance services among users.

The FAA is developing a traffic management system using third-party suppliers of services for UAS, AAM, and aircraft in upper airspace to complement conventional FAA air traffic services. The goal is to have a fully integrated information environment throughout the NAS. How non-traditional aircraft operations are managed generally depends on how high they fly.

Ground level to 400 feet 
Drones in airspace up to 400 feet above ground level can operate under UAS traffic management (UTM), where they meet established performance requirements and cooperatively separate through shared situational awareness. Crop monitoring, firefighting support, and short-distance package delivery are examples of the operations that could occur in this airspace not served by traditional air traffic services.

The FAA UTM integrated capabilities program establishes the concepts, requirements, and use cases associated with UTM and the flight information management system (FIMS) to safely manage UAS operations. This system works primarily through operator-to-operator and operator-to-FAA sharing of flight intent and airspace constraints.

FIMS provides the FAA with access to UTM data. It will support the increasing pace of UAS access to airspace and will eliminate the need for waivers. The program will also continue to develop ongoing standards to expand collision avoidance research and requirements for a new category of users in the UTM environment to ensure future systems interoperate within the NAS.

The FAA, NASA, and their partners demonstrated in 2019 how this kind of system can work in the future in a pilot program to form the foundation for a UAS traffic management system.

Up to 60,000 feet 
In airspace up to 60,000 feet mean sea level (MSL), UAS receive traditional air traffic services where required. Up to 18,000 feet MSL, operators observe a mix of visual and instrument flight rules. Examples of uses in this airspace include emergency monitoring and inspection. At and above 18,000 feet MSL, UAS operations such as large cargo delivery, border security, and weather monitoring operate only under instrument flight rules. The FAA analyzed UAS flights in controlled airspace and learned that it can manage the demand using existing automation.

Above 60,000 feet 
Aircraft flying above 60,000 feet MSL cooperatively separate through shared situational awareness. Air navigation service provider coordination is limited for these flights, some of which may be long endurance operations supporting internet services or research. Airships and hypersonic aircraft are examples of what could occupy these altitudes.

Flights at these altitudes have been few because traditional aircraft are not designed to ascend that high. With the anticipated increase in demand for manned and unmanned upper airspace operations, the FAA developed a concept of operations for safe and efficient flight above 60,000 feet MSL. It describes operator flight planning, interaction with air traffic control, and contingency management.

Technologies and Capabilities 
The FAA is working in various ways to help integrate unmanned aircraft into the National Airspace System.

DroneZone 
DroneZone is the official FAA website for managing drone services, including small unmanned aircraft systems (UAS) registration. DroneZone supports the collection and processing of airspace authorizations and waivers, operational waivers, and accident reporting. The FAA expects to develop other products and enhance the website, such as by providing a single access point for all DroneZone modules used by the UAS community.

Low Altitude Authorization and Notification 
As a form of UAS data exchange, the FAA created the Low Altitude Authorization and Notification Capability (LAANC), which automates how the FAA approves recreational pilots to fly small UAS in controlled airspace.

First operated as a prototype in 2017, LAANC simplifies and expands access to controlled airspace at or below 400 feet, increases awareness of where drone pilots can fly, and informs air traffic controllers of where and when drones are operating. In 2022, the FAA issued its millionth authorization to drone pilots.

The FAA established altitudes at and below which UAS may be granted automatic authorization. LAANC allows the FAA and FAA-approved companies to share data about airspace restrictions and pilot requests. The companies are known as UAS service suppliers, and they develop desktop and mobile applications to provide LAANC access for drone pilots.

The FAA introduces capabilities annually. As requirements and operating rules develop, the FAA will deploy updates to enhance operations. A common logging and monitoring service for LAANC deployed in 2022. To maintain continuity of services, the FAA is migrating the DroneZone and LAANC platforms to the FAA Cloud Services ecosystem through the UAS Ecosystem Capabilities program.

Airborne Collision Avoidance System 
The Airborne Collision Avoidance System X (ACAS X) has the flexibility to be used for new classes of users. It can reduce unnecessary alerts, select alternative surveillance sources, and enable airspace procedures and operations in the future. The ACAS program is divided into different subsets for multiple types of aircraft, including ACAS sXu for small UAS and ACAS Xr for rotorcraft.

ACAS sXu is a modular, tunable, and scalable technology to detect and avoid traffic. ACAS Xr extends the collision avoidance system capability with an optimized alerting logic that accounts for the unique flight characteristics of rotorcraft. The FAA will work with RTCA to develop minimum operational performance standards for both versions.

Remote Identification 
The Remote Identification rule requires most drones operating in U.S. airspace to have a remote identification capability and transmit information such as the drone's location and control station or takeoff location by September 16, 2023. Remote ID helps the FAA, other federal agencies, and law enforcement agencies to find the control station when a drone appears to be flying unsafely or is where it is not allowed to fly.

Remote identification of drones enables the safety and security needed for more complex drone operations. The FAA’s supporting services for Remote ID follow a model of data exchange with internal users and other government agencies similar to LAANC called DISCVR,  or Drone Information for Safety, Compliance, Verification, and Reporting.

DISCVR will provide capabilities to receive, correlate, retrieve, and distribute timely, comprehensive UAS information to authorized FAA staff and federal security partners using Remote ID information. Supporting services include user authentication and authorization, service logging and monitoring, and geospatial data management.

Space Operations 
Space operations are booming. In 2022, the FAA safely managed 79 commercially licensed space launches and five reentries, a sharp increase compared to previous years. The FAA is pursuing ways to improve management of space operations to meet their current and projected increase.

To ensure safety and security during commercial space operations, the FAA blocks airspace for extended periods of time. With 14 FAA-licensed commercial spaceports located across the country, complicated restrictions affect an increasing number of NAS users. The FAA objective is to safely maximize airspace availability to support space operations while minimizing negative effects on other NAS stakeholders.

Space Data Integrator 
The FAA is incorporating the Space Data Integrator (SDI), which is an automated tool that delivers spacecraft-related telemetry information to the FAA Air Traffic Control System Command Center. The FAA deployed an SDI operational prototype to monitor launch and reentry vehicle location and status in near real-time. SDI automatically transfers data to the Traffic Flow Management System, an FAA decision support system.

The prototype is expected to increase overall air traffic management efficiency and safety through awareness of an operator’s spacecraft location, trajectory, potential or actual debris, and return to Earth, while reducing manual work during space operations.

The SDI can shorten the length of airspace closures in half, from an average of more than four hours per launch to more than two hours. Reducing airspace closures will reduce flight delays, reroutes, and fuel consumption caused by lengthy restrictions. The use of SDI is expected to rise as partnerships with commercial space operators grow.

Hazard Risk and Management Software 
In an effort similar to SDI, the FAA Space Integration Capabilities Hazard Volume project will help customize and minimize airspace restrictions during space operations. The FAA will be able to manage the airspace more dynamically, resulting in less airspace blocked off before and during launch and reentry, and reduce the duration of closed airspace to other NAS users as the mission progresses.

An FAA-led team demonstrated a public-private approach to space integration that leverages dynamically generated hazard areas. In 2021, SpaceX participated with the FAA in the interest of public safety and agreed to use a prototype hazard risk and management software to generate debris hazard volumes using live data during an in-flight abort launch mission from the NASA Kennedy Space Center in Florida.

An En Route Automation Modernization system at the Florida NextGen Test Bed received and displayed the hazard volumes SpaceX produced using the software. The demonstration showed that the FAA has a viable way to safely and efficiently integrate space vehicle operations into the NAS while satisfying the needs of other stakeholders and users, such as airlines.

Challenges
While NextGen programs have demonstrated improvements, several ongoing and potential issues will affect implementation. In many cases, foundational systems are installed on aircraft as well as on the ground. The interoperability of air and ground systems, along with the need to synchronize equipage and other industry investments with FAA programs, has been a primary challenge. Standards, regulations, and procedures have to be developed. Program execution planning has to look at cost, schedule, and technical performance. Stakeholder acceptance and support in areas such as equipage and using new capabilities must be ongoing, and all involved — industry, federal agencies, government partners, and Congress — must be on the same path ahead.

Funding 
Industry and the FAA need to invest to make progress, and the FAA needs adequate and stable funding. Government shutdowns, furloughs, sequestration, and the lack of a long-term reauthorization make planning and executing modernization efforts more difficult. The stop-and-go approach of the annual appropriations process hurts long-term planning. A large, complex federal government agency and an unpredictable appropriations process will, at best, only deliver sporadic and incremental change. The FAA is on or ahead of schedule with some of the most critical programs, including Data Communications, System Wide Information Management and the ground portion of Automatic Dependent Surveillance–Broadcast, but to remain on schedule, future NextGen budgets need support through the appropriations process.

NextGen total cost estimates have not increased markedly since fiscal year 2004. The FAA's 2016 business case estimate projected the agency's estimated cost through 2030 at $20.6 billion — $2.6 billion more than it projected in 2012 and within the range of the Joint Planning and Development Office's 2007 estimate of $15 billion–$22 billion.

Using standard budget categories, the projected costs consist of: capital expenditures from the agency's facilities and equipment budget of $16 billion, research and other expenditures in the agency's research and development budget line of $1.5 billion, and operations expenses of $3.1 billion. Of the total, $5.8 billion has already been invested as of 2014. The investment from 2015 to 2030 is projected to be $14.8 billion.  The total equipage cost estimate for commercial aircraft from 2015 to 2030 is $4.9 billion, a decrease of $500 million as reported in the 2014 Business Case for NextGen. The equipage cost estimate for general aviation aircraft — jet, turboprop, and piston engine — through 2030 remains constant at $8.9 billion.

To manage NextGen with short-term funding horizons, the FAA rolled out improvements in smaller increments with more program segments to ensure affordability. The Department of Transportation Inspector General has concerns with the FAA's practice of dividing its programs into multiple segments, and funding each segment for a set timeframe or number of milestones because it may mask the final costs.

Equipage 
To encourage equipage, the FAA uses a combination of rules where needed, such as with Automatic Dependent Surveillance–Broadcast (ADS-B), and incentives where beneficial, for example with Data Communications (Data Comm), to achieve equipage levels that support the business case for the system under acquisition.

Fewer than 26,000 general aviation aircraft were equipped with ADS-B in July 2017, but as many as 160,000 needed it installed by January 1, 2020, to fly in certain airspace. According to July 2017 FAA data, 1,229 out of nearly 7,000 commercial aircraft and 25,662 of 160,000 general aviation aircraft have purchased and installed ADS-B avionics. As of October 1, 2022, 153,436 U.S. aircraft were properly equipped for ADS-B. Through an FAA incentive and industry investment, the Data Comm program exceeded its goal of 1,900 domestic air carrier aircraft equipped by 2019. As of October 2019, an estimated 7,800 aircraft were equipped.

To achieve the full benefits of trajectory-based operations, users must equip with the required avionics, including Performance Based Navigation, Data Comm, and ADS-B In, and industry agrees on the value of equipping despite the difficulties. The FAA and NextGen Advisory Committee partnered to create a minimum capability list that covers communications, navigation, surveillance, and resiliency. The list serves as a guide of recommended minimum aircraft capabilities and associated equipage needed to derive the maximum benefit from NextGen investments and operational improvements.

Training 
Implementing trajectory-based operations will require cultural changes among air traffic controllers and industry. Training and other human factors changes will be necessary for air traffic controllers, pilots, traffic flow managers, and dispatchers. Industry will need to work closely with the FAA as the agency moves to this new model. To maximize throughput, airlines and others have to agree that throughput and predictability are the primary metrics the FAA will use to judge the system's effectiveness. This could be different from, or even in some cases counter to, the traditional flight efficiency metrics used by airlines including reduced delay, reduced track miles, and reduced fuel burn.

Operational integration 
Operational integration of all air-ground capabilities is needed to achieve the full benefits of NextGen. Due to the integrated nature of NextGen, many of its component systems are mutually dependent on one or more other systems. The FAA implements systems through segments that the stakeholder community agrees are useful and that balance costs and benefits. The FAA expects to complete implementation of all major planned systems by 2030 but not the full integration necessary to provide all anticipated NextGen benefits.

New entrants 
The demand for access to airspace by unmanned aircraft systems (UAS) and commercial spacecraft is evolving, and the FAA must accommodate changing needs. The FAA is pursuing ways to safely and efficiently integrate these new entrants into the National Airspace System (NAS) with minimal effect on other NAS users. This effort involves determining the required automation support, as well as the communications, navigation, and surveillance capabilities that account for the unique performance characteristics of UAS and spacecraft. NextGen technologies are expected to facilitate this integration.

Environmental impacts 
Communities around airports are concerned about increased environmental problems, particularly noise. Nextgen's Performance Based Navigation (PBN) has created a "rail" or concentrated path of flights in cities across the United States. The new paths often reduce the number of people exposed to noise, but those who get noise receive it far more consistently. The impact of noise on health, well-being, and economic output are well-documented. Excessive exposure to noise can lead to learning difficulties in children, decreased cardiovascular health, and quality of life.

Congress set up a coalition to study the noise issues. A Government Accountability Office report on environmental impacts at airports indicated that the changes in flight paths from NextGen would affect some communities that were previously unaffected or minimally affected by aircraft noise and expose them to increased noise levels. These levels could trigger the need for environmental reviews, as well as raise community concerns. The report found that addressing environmental impacts can delay the implementation of operational changes, and indicated that a systematic approach to addressing these impacts and the resulting community concerns may help reduce such delays.

Regarding noise, the FAA has renewed its focus to provide information to the community and solicit aviation user and citizen input when developing procedures. The FAA has traditionally followed the National Environmental Policy Act (NEPA) process when designing and implementing procedures. However, in recent years, more community involvement is necessary, especially when flight paths are being changed due to new PBN procedures. The FAA claims to have increased its public engagement to educate communities about how the agency develops procedures and measures noise, and to listen to residents' concerns. The FAA also works with airports, airlines, and community officials to determine how the agency can best balance the FAA's pursuit of safer, more efficient flight paths with the needs of nearby communities.

Cybersecurity 
As the agency transitions to NextGen, the FAA faces cybersecurity challenges in at least three areas: protecting air traffic control information systems, protecting aircraft avionics that operate and guide aircraft, and clarifying cybersecurity roles and responsibilities among multiple FAA offices. The FAA's Interagency Planning Office (IPO) is involved in the Interagency Core Cyber Team (ICCT) led jointly by the FAA, Department of Defense, and Department of Homeland Security to promote collaboration and federal government leadership in aviation cybersecurity. It applies partner agencies' cybersecurity expertise, technologies, and tools for shared benefit, and identifies and assesses cybersecurity vulnerabilities in aviation and ways to mitigate them. The IPO also established two ICCT sub-teams — Cyber Exercises and Cyber R&D — to ensure interagency cybersecurity exercises and research yield the greatest benefits. Cyber Guard exercises highlight the shortcomings in cybersecurity guidance and policy. To address these deficits, the ICCT and IPO co-sponsored a survey of cyber guidance, policy, regulations, authorities, and more with the Department of Defense.

Pandemic 
The FAA took steps to protect its workforce from and limit exposure to the novel coronavirus that causes COVID-19, including the use of maximum telework. Because implementation cannot entirely be accomplished remotely, the pandemic slowed the progress of NextGen.

Criticism

Progress 
In May 2017, U.S. Department of Transportation Inspector General Calvin Scovel told Congress that although NextGen has progressed, full implementation of all capabilities and the realization of benefits was still years away. Of the 156 milestones the FAA reported as completed through March 2017, most were attributed to the implementation of wake recategorization and Data Communications (Data Comm) at airport towers. Significant work remains to deploy new Performance Based Navigation (PBN) procedures to capture airspace efficiencies and boost arrival rates, develop surface technologies to enhance capacity on crowded runways and taxiways, and install Data Comm in high-altitude airspace.

To continue progress toward major program milestones, the FAA will need to resolve key risk areas that will materially affect the delivery, capabilities, and benefits of modernization priorities. Recognizing these risks with its NextGen Advisory Committee priority areas, the FAA adjusted its plans and established a three-year rolling joint implementation plan that is updated at the beginning of each fiscal year to focus on high-benefit, high-readiness capabilities. The FAA and industry also agreed on ways to increase communication on these issues.

The Government Accountability Office reported the FAA is being slow to integrate drones into the National Airspace System and has no comprehensive integration strategy. Operators also face difficulty in conducting advanced operations because the FAA has been unclear of what is required.

Communication 
Another concern is that the FAA's business case does not communicate the range of uncertainty or complex factors associated with NextGen implementation to Congress, aviation stakeholders, or the traveling public, which limits the agency's ability to set realistic expectations for NextGen benefits. The FAA is continuing to work with industry to assess potential benefits from NextGen technologies and the steps required to realize them.

Since 2016, the FAA has analyzed benefits for more than 10 capabilities across 60 sites in partnership with the aviation industry through the Joint Analysis Team under the NextGen Advisory Committee. Some NextGen implementations do not produce measurable benefits, such as System Wide Information Management.

The National Research Council's 2015 "Review of the Next Generation Air Transportation System" report found that the effort emphasizes modernizing aging equipment and systems — a shift from its original vision that is not clear to all stakeholders.

Performance 
In a report from Lou E. Dixon, principal assistant inspector general for auditing and evaluation, the FAA's major acquisitions since the creation of the Air Traffic Organization continue to lack in performance. The cost of six programs increased a total of $692 million, and schedule delays averaged 25 months. The FAA's implementation of this approach has led to unclear and inconsistent reporting on overall program costs, schedules, and benefits. Notwithstanding reforms, several underlying and systemic issues — including overambitious plans, shifting requirements, software development problems, ineffective contract and program management, and unreliable cost and schedule estimates — affect the FAA's ability to introduce new technologies and capabilities that are critical to transitioning to NextGen.

During a meeting with airline CEOs shortly after taking office, President Donald Trump said the Obama administration spent more than $7 billion to upgrade the system and "totally failed." However, FAA Administrator Michael Huerta said in a speech that NextGen had already provided $2.7 billion in benefits, and is on track to provide more than $157 billion more by 2030. Huerta also acknowledged that government procurement requirements have slowed the NextGen rollout. The FAA has since revised the current and projected value of benefits.

System architecture 
Modernization is critical and requires ongoing support. The National Research Council's 2015 "Review of the Next Generation Air Transportation System" report explains that NextGen needs an explicit system architecture — in addition to its existing enterprise architecture  — to guide its development, manage risk, and cope with change. To create this architecture, FAA should build an architecture community and also strengthen its workforce in several technical fields. The report also examines the incorporation of cybersecurity, unmanned aircraft systems, and human factors into the NextGen architecture. Finally, the report considers NextGen's anticipated costs and benefits, noting that airlines are not motivated to spend money on NextGen because they receive few direct benefits and face schedule uncertainty.

Noise 
Progress made in modernizing aviation navigation has been countered by NextGen's environmental impact. More-precise Performance Based Navigation (PBN) with GPS-based waypoints can reduce fuel burn, emissions, and noise exposure for a majority of communities, but the consolidated flight paths PBN produces can also increase noise exposure for people who live under those flight paths. Many localities even hear air traffic over previously quiet areas.

Navigation changes angered residents living with increased noise from the extra traffic, and they pushed back on the FAA. Multiple municipalities filed suit, with more considering it. Some of the metropolitan airports affected are Baltimore, Boston, Charlotte, Los Angeles, Phoenix, San Diego, and Washington, D.C. Some community members believe efforts to reduce noise over homes should have been predicted before NextGen navigation changes went into effect, and that the decisions were a complete failure on the part FAA and its administrator, Michael Huerta.

A committee tasked with recommending ways to reduce airplane noise in California voted in favor of a new flight path similar to one in place before a March 2015 change by the FAA. It would improve and not eliminate NextGen modifications. Some flight patterns were not changed in the Washington, D.C., area after the FAA received community feedback, although changes brought by NextGen were still considered a problem and won't alter the amount of noise in the area.

Privatization 
Before a meeting to discuss air traffic control privatization, U.S. House of Representatives Committee on Transportation and Infrastructure staff sent a letter in May 2017 to the committee members noting a 35-year legacy of failed air traffic control modernization management, including NextGen. The letter said the FAA initially described NextGen as fundamentally transforming how air traffic would be managed. However, in 2015 the National Research Council explained that NextGen, as currently executed, was not broadly transformational and that it is a set of programs to implement a suite of incremental changes to the National Airspace System (NAS).

Criticism of NextGen led to a renewed drive to reform air traffic control, supported by the Trump Administration, by moving this function from the government to a not-for-profit, independent entity managed by a professional board of directors. Privatization was an effort to improve the pace of NAS modernization, and is supported by Airlines for America, the industry trade organization for the leading U.S. airlines. However, the general aviation community resists it because it may increase their costs of operation. In 2018, the leading advocate for privatization, Rep. Bill Shuster, ended his effort as there was not enough support for it despite bipartisan support among lawmakers, industry, and labor groups.

Future 
Building upon NextGen and trajectory-based operations, the next FAA initiative for U.S. National Airspace System modernization is the Info-Centric NAS (ICN). The FAA published “Charting Aviation’s Future: Vision for an Info-Centric National Airspace System” in 2022 to begin the discussion of what comes after NextGen. The ICN intends to incorporate innovative technologies into a fully integrated information environment for all types of operations, from the smallest drone to the largest spacecraft. The ICN vision covers three areas: operations, infrastructure, and integrated safety management.

References

External links
FAA Office of NextGen
FAA NAS Animated Storyboard
FAA Community Involvement
FAA NextGen Videos

Air traffic control in the United States
Federal Aviation Administration
Electronic navigation
NASA aeronautical programs
2003 introductions
Aviation initiatives